The 2005 Swedish Open, also known by its sponsored name Synsam Swedish Open, was a men's tennis event played on outdoor clay courts in Båstad, Sweden. It was the 58th edition of the Swedish Open tournament and was part of the International Series of the 2005 ATP Tour. The tournament was held from 10 July through 16 July 2005. First-seeded Rafael Nadal won the singles title.

Finals

Singles

 Rafael Nadal defeated  Tomáš Berdych, 2–6, 6–2, 6–4

Doubles

 Jonas Björkman /  Joachim Johansson defeated  José Acasuso /  Sebastián Prieto, 6–2, 6–3

External links
Singles draw
Doubles draw

Swedish Open
Swedish
Swedish Open
July 2005 sports events in Europe
Swed